Additional Solicitor General of India abbreviated as Addl. SGI is a law officer of India who assists the Solicitor-General and the Attorney-General. Addl. SGI is governed by Law Officers (Conditions of Service) Rules, 1987.

List of incumbent Additional Solicitor Generals 
The list of incumbent Law Officers (i.e. AGI, SGI, Addl. SGIs) as of 2 September 2022 are as follows:

Duties
Duties of Solicitor General of India and other law officers are laid out in Law Officers (Conditions of Service) Rules, 1987:
to give advice to the Government of India upon such legal matters, and to perform such other duties of a legal character, as may from time to time, be referred or assigned to him by the Government of India.
to appear, whenever required, in the Supreme Court or in any High Court on behalf of the Government of India in cases (including suits, writ petitions, appeal and other proceedings) in which the Government of India is concerned as a party or is otherwise interested;
to represent the Government of India in any reference made by the President to the Supreme Court under Article 143 of the Constitution; and
to discharge such other functions as are conferred on a Law Officer by or under the Constitution or any other Law for the time being in force.

Restrictions of private practice
As law officers represent government of India, there are certain restrictions which are put on their private practice. A law officer is not allowed to:
hold briefs in any court for any party except the Government of India or the government of a State or any University, Government School or College, local authority, Public Service Commission, Port Trust, Port Commissioners, Government aided or Government managed hospitals, a Government company, any Corporation owned or controlled by the State, any body or institution in which the Government has a preponderating interest;
advise any party against the Government of India or a Public Sector Undertaking, or in cases in which he is likely to be called upon to advise, or appear for, the Government of India or a Public Sector Undertaking;
defend an accused person in a criminal prosecution, without the permission of the Government of India; or
accept appointment to any office in any company or corporation without the permission of the Government of India;
advise any Ministry or Department of Government of India or any statutory organization or any Public Sector Undertaking unless the proposal or a reference in this regard is received through the Ministry of Law and Justice, Department of Legal Affairs.

References

External links
Official website of Supreme Court of India
List of law officers of India

Indian lawyers
Supreme Court of India